The Kobe Bryant sexual assault case began on July 18, 2003, when the news media reported that the sheriff's office in Eagle, Colorado, had arrested professional basketball player Kobe Bryant in connection with an investigation of a sexual assault complaint filed by a 19-year-old hotel employee. 

Bryant had checked into The Lodge and Spa at Cordillera, a hotel in Edwards, Colorado, on June 30 in advance of having surgery near there on July 2 under Richard Steadman. The woman accused Bryant of raping her in his hotel room on July 1. She filed a police report and authorities questioned Bryant about bruising on the accuser's neck. Bryant admitted to a sexual encounter with his accuser but insisted the sex was consensual. The case was dropped after Bryant's accuser refused to testify in the case. A separate civil suit was later filed against Bryant by the woman. This was settled out of court and included Bryant publicly apologizing to his accuser, the public, and family, while denying the allegations.

Arrest
Eagle County Sheriff investigators confronted Bryant with the sexual assault accusation on July 2. During the July 2003 interview with investigators, Bryant initially told investigators that he did not have sexual intercourse with his accuser, a 19-year-old woman who worked at the hotel where Bryant was staying. When the officers told Bryant that she had taken an exam that yielded physical evidence, such as semen, Bryant admitted to having sexual intercourse with her, but stated that the sex was consensual. When asked about bruises on the accuser's neck, Bryant admitted to "strangling" her during the encounter, stating that he held her "from the back" "around her neck", that strangling during sex was his "thing" and that he had a pattern of strangling a different sex partner (not his wife) during their recurring sexual encounters. When asked how hard he was holding onto her neck, Bryant stated, "My hands are strong. I don't know." Bryant stated that he assumed consent for sex because of the accuser's body language.

Law enforcement officials collected evidence from Bryant and he agreed to submit to a rape test kit and a voluntary polygraph test. On July 4, Sheriff Joe Hoy issued an arrest warrant for Bryant. Bryant flew from Los Angeles back to Eagle, Colorado, to surrender to police. He was immediately released on $25,000 bond, and news of the arrest became public two days after that. On July 18, the Eagle County District Attorney's office filed a formal charge against Bryant for sexual assault. If convicted, Bryant faced probation to life in prison. On July 18, after he was formally charged, Bryant held a news conference in which he adamantly denied having raped the woman. He admitted to having an adulterous sexual encounter with her but insisted it was consensual.

Criminal case
In December 2003, pre-trial hearings were conducted to consider motions about the admissibility of evidence.  During those hearings, the prosecution accused Bryant's defense team of attacking his accuser's credibility.  It was revealed that she wore underpants containing another man's semen and pubic hair to her rape exam the day after the alleged incident. Detective Doug Winters stated that the yellow underwear she wore to her rape exam contained sperm from another man, along with Caucasian pubic hair. Bryant's defense stated that the exam results showed "compelling evidence of innocence" because the accuser must have had another sexual encounter immediately after the incident. She told investigators that she grabbed dirty underwear by mistake from her laundry basket when she left her home for the examination. On the day she was examined, she said she hadn't showered since the morning of the incident. The examination found evidence of vaginal trauma, which Bryant's defense team claimed was consistent with having sex with multiple partners in two days.

The evidence recovered by police included the T-shirt that Bryant wore the night of the incident, which had three small stains of the accuser's blood on it. The smudge was verified to be the accuser's blood by DNA testing and probably was not menstrual blood because the accuser said she had her period two weeks earlier. It was revealed that Bryant leaned the woman over a chair to have sex with her, which allegedly caused the bleeding. This was the sex act in question, as the accuser claims she told Bryant to stop, but he would not, and Bryant claims he stopped after asking if he could ejaculate on her face.

Trina McKay, the resort's night auditor, said she saw the accuser as she was leaving to go home, and "she did not look or sound as if there had been any problem". However, Bobby Pietrack, the accuser's high-school friend and a bellman at the resort, said she appeared to be very upset, and "told me that Kobe Bryant had forced sex with her".

A few weeks before the trial was scheduled to begin, the accuser wrote a letter to state investigator Gerry Sandberg clarifying some details of her first interview by Colorado police.  She wrote, "I told Detective Winters that on that morning while leaving I had car troubles.  That was not true.  When I called in late to work that day that was the reason I gave my boss for being late.  In all reality, I had simply overslept . . . I told Detective Winters that Mr. Bryant had made me stay in the room and wash my face.  While I was held against my will in that room, I was not forced to wash my face.  I did not wash my face.  Instead, I stopped at the mirror by the elevator on that floor to clean my face up.  I am extremely disappointed in myself and also very sorry to anyone misled by that mix-up of information.  I said what I said because I felt that Detective Winters did not believe what had happened to me."

Bryant's defense lawyer Pamela Mackey asserted that the accuser was taking an anti-psychotic drug for the treatment of schizophrenia at the time of the incident. Lindsey McKinney, who lived with the accuser, said the woman twice tried to kill herself at school by overdosing on sleeping pills.  Before the alleged incident, the accuser, an aspiring singer, tried out for the television show American Idol with the song "Forgive" by Rebecca Lynn Howard, but failed to advance. In addition to the woman's moral character and reputation being challenged by Bryant's defense lawyer, she received death threats and hate mail and her identity was leaked multiple times.

On September 1, 2004, Eagle County District Judge Terry Ruckriegle dismissed the charges against Bryant, after prosecutors spent more than $200,000 preparing for trial, because his accuser informed them that she was unwilling to testify.

On the same day that the criminal case was dismissed,  Bryant issued the following statement through his attorney:

Civil case
In August 2004, the accuser filed a civil lawsuit against Bryant over the incident.  In March 2005, the two parties settled that lawsuit.  The terms of the settlement were not disclosed to the public. The Los Angeles Times reported that legal experts estimated the settlement was more than $2.5 million.

Aftermath
Eight months after the initial incident, the Lodge & Spa at Cordillera remodeled and as part of that sold some furniture. There was speculation that some pieces included in this sale were from "Room 35" where Bryant had allegedly stayed at the time. The lodge denied this and stated they had disposed of the furniture from that room separately. The spa was sold in 2019 and converted into a drug treatment facility.

After the allegations, Bryant signed a seven-year contract valued at $136 million over seven years, and he regained several of his endorsements from Nike, Spalding, and Coca-Cola although his contracts with brands including Nutella and McDonald's were not renewed.

References

External links

Kobe Bryant Police Interview: NBA star's graphic account of hotel room encounter at The Smoking Gun
Kobe Bryant's Disturbing Rape Case: The DNA Evidence, the Accuser's Story, and the Half-Confession at The Daily Beast
Kobe Rebounds: The troubled rape case of the tarnished hoop star ends not in a verdict but with his apology to his accuser in Time magazine

21st-century American trials
2003 in Colorado
Eagle County, Colorado
July 2003 events in the United States
Sexual assault case
National Basketball Association controversies
Rape trials in the United States
Sexual assaults in the United States
Sexuality in Colorado